Lysinibacillus halotolerans is a Gram-positive, aerobic, halotolerant, endospore-forming and rod-shaped bacterium from the genus of Lysinibacillus which has been isolated from saline-alkaline soil from Lingxian County.

References

Bacillaceae
Bacteria described in 2014